The 2016 TCR International Series Sepang round was the tenth round of the 2016 TCR International Series season. It took place on 29 September–1 October at the Sepang International Circuit.

Roberto Colciago won the first race, starting from pole position and Kevin Gleason gained the second one, both driving a Honda Civic TCR.

Ballast
Due to the results obtained in the previous round, Jean-Karl Vernay received +30 kg, Stefano Comini +20 kg and Maťo Homola +10 kg.

Classification

Qualifying

 — Rafaël Galiana were moved to the back of the grid for having not set a time within the 107% limit.

Race 1

Race 2

 — Maťo Homola was given a 10-second penalty for causing an collision with Pepe Oriola.
 — Stefano Comini was given a 30-second penalty for causing an collision with Tin Sritrai.

Standings after the event

Drivers' Championship standings

Model of the Year standings

Teams' Championship standings

 Note: Only the top five positions are included for both sets of drivers' standings.

References

Notes

External links
TCR International Series official website

Sepang
TCR
TCR